Quinton Kurt Kannemeyer (born 31 May 1984) is a South African cricketer who played for Boland between 2005 and 2011. A right-handed batsman and right-arm medium-fast bowler, he made his first-class debut on 24 November 2005 against Eastern Province.

References
Quinton Kannemeyer profile at CricketArchive

1984 births
Living people
South African cricketers
Boland cricketers